Irving Glacier may refer to:
 Irving Glacier (Antarctica)
 Irving Glacier (Oregon), in Cascade Range, Oregon, United States